Bossonnens Castle is a castle in the municipality of Bossonnens of the Canton of Fribourg in Switzerland.  It is a Swiss heritage site of national significance.

See also
 List of castles and fortresses in Switzerland
 Cultural heritage protection in Switzerland
 Historic monument (Switzerland)
 Inventory of Swiss Heritage Sites 
 Château

References

Cultural property of national significance in the canton of Fribourg
Castles in the canton of Fribourg
Ruined castles in Switzerland